Oreobeiline is an morphinan alkaloid of Beilschmiedia with anti-acetylcholinesterase, anti-alpha-glucosidase, anti-leishmanial, and anti-fungal activities.

See also
 Sinomenine

External links
 Anti-acetylcholinesterase, anti-α-glucosidase, anti-leishmanial and anti-fungal activities of chemical constituents of Beilschmiedia species

Benzylisoquinoline alkaloids
Morphinans
Methoxy compounds
Heterocyclic compounds with 4 rings